Stantsyonny is a village (a work settlement) in Akmola Region, in northern part of Kazakhstan. The KATO code is 111037100.

Demographics

Population 
Population:  (1018 males and 1114 females). As of 2009, the population of Stantsyonny was 2249 inhabitants (1081 males and 1168 females).

References

Notes

Populated places in Akmola Region